Peter Hammond may refer to:

 Peter J. Hammond (born c. 1930s), British television writer
 Peter J. Hammond (economist) (born 1945), British professor of economics
 Peter Hammond (Hammond, Louisiana) (1797–1870), Swedish-born American settler for whom Hammond, Louisiana, is named
 Peter Francis Hammond (1887–1971), American politician
 Peter Hammond (actor) (1923–2011), British actor and television director